Clarkeulia hamata is a species of moth of the family Tortricidae. It is found in Peru.

The wingspan is 19–21 mm. The ground colour of the forewings is cream ferruginous with rust portions. The hindwings are grey, but cream towards the base.

Etymology
The species name refers to the shape of the saccular spines which are hooked apically and is derived from Latin hamata (meaning hooked).

References

Moths described in 2010
Clarkeulia
Moths of South America
Taxa named by Józef Razowski